The Slovak football league system is a series of interconnected leagues for club football in Slovakia.

The system

From 2022-23 onwards

?-2021/22

See also 
 Football league system in Czechoslovakia

External links 
 Futbalnet.sk

´

   
Slovakia